Mount Waialeale  is a shield volcano and the second highest point on the island of Kauai in the Hawaiian Islands. Its name literally means "rippling water" or "overflowing water" 

However, recent reports mention that over the period 1978–2007 the wettest spot in Hawaii is Big Bog on Maui ( per year).

Climate

Climate and rainfall statistics

The Weather Network and The Guinness Book of Weather Records  quotes  rain per year, while  quotes  as the average annual rainfall at Mount Waialeale and  claims  falls here. Similarly, The Weather Network and the Guinness Book of Weather Records quote 335 days with rain here while  suggests that rain falls on 360 days per year.

The local tourist industry of Kauai has promoted it as one of the wettest places on earth, which it is. The rainfall at Waiʻaleʻale is evenly distributed through the year.

Causes

Several factors give the summit of Waialeale more potential to create precipitation than the rest of the island chain:
 Its northern position relative to the main Hawaiian Islands provides more exposure to frontal systems that bring rain during the winter.
These serve to funnel and concentrate any available precipitable water directly towards the mountain.    

Ecology
The great rainfall in the area produces the Alakai Wilderness Preserve, a large boggy area that is home to many rare plants.  The ground is so wet that although trails exist, access by foot to the Waiʻaleʻale area is extremely difficult.

A number of rare local plant species are named for this mountain, including Astelia waialealae, Melicope waialealae, and the endemic Dubautia waialealae.

See also
 Big Bog, Maui

References

Sources

External links
 Honolulu Star-Bulletin article on Waialeale
 Site with hiking info on routes to Waialeale and Kawaikini and summit photos.
 "Real-time" rainfall data from the USGS Waialeale Raingauge

Landforms of Kauai
Mountains of Hawaii
Volcanoes of Hawaii
Weather extremes of Earth
Polygenetic shield volcanoes